The Oklahoma Court of Civil Appeals is an intermediate appellate court in the state of Oklahoma. Cases are assigned to it by the Oklahoma Supreme Court, the state's highest court for civil matters.

The court consists of twelve judges divided into four panels with three judges each. They are responsible for the majority of appellate decisions in Oklahoma. Furthermore, the Oklahoma Supreme Court has the power to release the court's opinions for publication, in which case they have value as precedent.

Two of the court's four panels are housed in Tulsa, Oklahoma. The two Oklahoma City panels are housed in the Oklahoma State Capitol building.

History
The Oklahoma Court of Civil Appeals was established by the state legislature in 1970 under Title 20, section 30.1, of the Oklahoma Statutes, which provides: "There is hereby established an intermediate appellate court to be known as the Court of Civil Appeals of the State of Oklahoma which shall have the power to determine or otherwise dispose of any cases that are assigned to it by the Supreme Court." Any decision of the Court of Civil Appeals in any case assigned to it, upon petition by one of the parties involved, may be reviewed by the Oklahoma Supreme Court if a majority of its Justices direct that a petition for certiorari be granted, and the Supreme Court may, by order, recall a case from the Court of Civil Appeals.

Selection process
Appellate judges are appointed by the governor from a list of three candidates nominated by the Oklahoma Judicial Nominating Commission. The commission is composed of six attorneys who are "members of the Oklahoma Bar Association and who have been elected by the other active members of their district," 6 non-attorneys appointed by the governor, and 3 non-attorney "members at large," one to be selected by the President Pro Tempore of the Senate, one to be selected by the Speaker of the House of Representatives, and one to be selected by at least eight members of the commission itself.  Article 7B, section 3, of the Oklahoma Constitution sets forth the composition of the nominating commission in even greater detail.

Members

Current judges
The judges of the Court of Civil Appeals are: 

This graphical timeline depicts the length of each current judge's tenure (but not seniority) on the Court:

Timeline of justices
Beginning in 1987, seats on the Court of Civil Appeals are filled by non-partisan appointment by the Governor of Oklahoma upon nomination by the Oklahoma Judicial Nominating Commission. Judges serve until the next general election following their appointment at which they are retained or rejected. If retained, they serve for an additional six-years until the next retention election.

Note: 
Bar key:

References

External links

Flowchart of the Oklahoma Court System, showing the jurisdiction of the Court of Civil Appeals

State appellate courts of the United States
Oklahoma state courts
1970 establishments in Oklahoma
Courts and tribunals established in 1970